The 522nd Special Operations Squadron, nicknamed the Fireballs, was a unit of the United States Air Force. It was part of the 27th Special Operations Group, the flying component of the 27th Special Operations Wing at Cannon Air Force Base. It was the first to operate the MC-130J Commando II.

The 522nd was originally organized in 1940 as the 16th Bombardment Squadron. When the United States entered World War II the squadron was deploying to the Philippines. Its ground echelon fought as infantry, with most members surrendering at Bataan, while the air echelon fought in the Netherlands East Indies, earning the squadron three Distinguished Unit Citation (DUC)s. In May 1942, the squadron reformed at Hunter Field, Georgia. It deployed to the Mediterranean Theater of Operations, where it was redesignated the 522nd Fighter-Bomber Squadron and was awarded an additional three DUCs. Following V-E Day, the squadron served in the occupation forces in Germany until the fall of 1945, when it returned to the United States and was inactivated.

The 522nd was reactivated in 1946 and assigned to Strategic Air Command (SAC) as a fighter escort unit. During the Korean War, the squadron deployed to Japan and Korea and was awarded its seventh DUC. In 1957, SAC transferred its fighter squadrons to Tactical Air Command and the squadron became the 522nd Tactical Fighter Squadron the following year. It conducted numerous deployments to bases in Europe and the Pacific, including one to Thailand, where it again saw combat during the Vietnam War. The squadron was inactivated in 2007, when its parent wing converted from the fighter to the special operations mission.

The squadron was reactivated in 2012 as a special operations unit, but was inactivated in 2014 and its mission, personnel and equipment were transferred to the 9th Special Operations Squadron.

History

World War II
The 522nd was originally constituted in 1939 as the 16th Bombardment Squadron (Light) and activated on 1 February 1940. It was stationed at Barksdale Field, Louisiana, and later at Hunter Field, Georgia, before moving to Luzon in the Philippines in 1941. After war began between the United States and Japan, the unit's air echelon operated in Australia. When American units in the Philippines surrendered, ground elements of the unit were part of the Bataan Death March.

The unit was redesignated the 522nd Fighter-Bomber Squadron on 23 August 1943 and then the 522nd Fighter Squadron, Single Engine, on 30 May 1944. During World War II, it was one of the most decorated U.S. Army Air Force units. The unit later served in conflicts such as the Korean and Vietnam wars, and flew almost a dozen different aircraft in support of various missions.

Strategic Air Command

Tactical Air Command

Air Combat Command

The 522nd Fighter Squadron inactivated in 2007 when the 27th Fighter Wing became the 27th Special Operations Wing.

Special operations
The 522nd Special Operations Squadron was reactivated at Cannon Air Force Base on 7 April 2011. The first to be equipped with the Lockheed MC-130J Commando II special operations aircraft, it was tasked with supporting special operations commanders through day and night low-level infiltration, exfiltration, resupply, and air refueling of helicopters. In 2012, it achieved initial operational capability.

The unit was inactivated and a ceremony marking this was held on 9 December 2014. The squadron's personnel, aircraft, and equipment were transferred to the 9th Special Operations Squadron, which moved to Cannon without personnel or equipment from Hurlburt Field.

Lineage
 Constituted as the 16th Bombardment Squadron (Light) on 22 December 1939
 Activated on 1 February 1940
 Redesignated: 522nd Fighter-Bomber Squadron on 23 August 1943
 Redesignated: 522nd Fighter Squadron, Single Engine on 30 May 1944
 Inactivated on 7 November 1945
 Activated on 20 August 1946
 Redesignated 522nd Fighter Squadron, Two Engine on 22 July 1947
 Redesignated 522nd Fighter Squadron, Jet on 1 December 1949
 Redesignated 522nd Fighter-Escort Squadron on 1 February 1950
 Redesignated 522nd Strategic Fighter Squadron on 20 January 1953
 Redesignated 522nd Fighter-Bomber Squadron on 1 July 1957
 Redesignated 522nd Tactical Fighter Squadron on 1 July 1958
 Redesignated 522nd Fighter Squadron on 1 November 1991
 Inactivated on 30 September 2007
 Redesignated 522nd Special Operations Squadron on 1 March 2011
 Activated 7 April 2011
 Inactivated c. 9 December 2014

Assignments
 27th Bombardment Group (later, 27th Fighter-Bomber Group, 27th Fighter Group), 1 February 1940 – 7 November 1945
 27th Fighter Group (later 27 Fighter-Escort Group), 20 August 1946 (attached to 27th Fighter-Escort Wing after 6 August 1951)
 27th Fighter-Escort Wing (later 27th Strategic Fighter Wing, 27th Fighter-Bomber Wing, 27th Tactical Fighter Wing, 27th Fighter Wing), 16 June 1952
 Attached to unknown, 6 September–18 December 1958
 Attached to TUSLOG, 18 October 1959 – 22 February 1960 and 5 February–15 June 1962
 Attached to 405th Fighter Wing, 13 February–c. 7 March 1961, 8 August–c. 20 September 1964 and 15 August–25 November 1965
 Attached to 2nd Air Division, 12 December 1962 – c. 15 February 1963, 16 March–6 May 1964 and c. 20 September–15 November 1964
 27th Operations Group, 1 November 1991
 Twelfth Air Force, 1 October 2007 – 21 December 2007 (attached to 712th Operations Group (Provisional))
 27th Special Operations Group, 7 April 2011 – c. 9 December 2014

Stations

 Barksdale Field, Louisiana, 1 February 1940
 Army Air Base, Savannah, Georgia, 7 October 1940 – 19 October 1941
 Fort William McKinley, Luzon, Philippines, 20 November 1941
 Lipa Airfield, Luzon, Philippines, 22 December 1941
 Cabcaben, Luzon, Philippines, (Ground echelon), 25 December 1941
 Air echelon operated from Archerfield Airport, 24 December 1941 – 16 February 1942
 Bataan, Luzon, Philippines, (Ground echelon), 29 December 1941
 Air echelon operated from Batchelor Airfield, Australia, 17 February-c. 8 March 1942
 Air echelon operated from Archerfield Airport, Brisbane, Australia, c. 10-c. 25 March 1942
 Charters Towers Airfield, Australia, April-4 May 1942
 Hunter Field, Georgia, 4 May 1942
 Key Field, Mississippi, 14 July 1942
 Hattiesburg Army Air Field, Mississippi, 15 August 1942
 Harding Field, Louisiana, 25 October–21 November 1942
 Sainte-Barbe du Tlélat Airfield, Algeria, 26 December 1942
 Nouvion Airfield, Algeria, 5 January 1943
 Ras el Ma Airfield, French Morocco, 4 April 1943
 Korba Airfield, Tunisia, c. 8 June 1943
 Gela Airfield, Sicily, 18 July 1943
 Barcellona Landing Ground, Sicily, Italy, 3 September 1943
 Capaccio Airfield, Italy, 18 September 1943
 Paestum Airfield, Italy, 4 November 1943
 Pomigliano Airfield, Italy, 19 January 1944
 Castel Volturno Airfield, Italy, 10 April 1944
 Santa Maria Airfield, Italy, 9 May 1944
 Le Banca Airfield, Italy, 7 June 1944
 Ciampino Airfield, Italy, 12 June 1944
 Voltone Airfield, Italy, 4 July 1944
 Serragia Airfield, Corsica, France, 10 July 1944
 Le Luc Airfield, France, 25 August 1944
 Salon de Provence Airfield (Y-16), France, 30 August 1944
 Loyettes Airfield (Y-25), France, 11 September 1944
 Tarquinia Airfield, Italy, 2 October 1944
 Pontedera Airfield, Italy, 3 December 1944

 St-Dizier Airfield (A-64), France, 21 February 1945
 Toul/Ochey Airfield (A-96), France, 19 March 1945
 Biblis Airfield (Y-78), Germany, 5 April 1945
 AAF Station Mannheim/Sandhofen (Y-79), Germany, 23 June 1945
 AAF Station Stuttgart/Echterdingen (R-50), Germany, 15 September–20 October 1945
 Camp Shanks, New York, 6–7 November 1945
 AAF Station Fritzlar, Germany, 20 August 1946
 AAF Station Bad Kissingen, Germany, 25 June 1947
 Andrews Field, Maryland, 25 June 1947
 Kearney Army Air Field (later, Kearney Air Force Base), Nebraska, 16 July 1947
 Bergstrom Air Force Base, Texas, 16 March 1949
 Deployed to Taegu Air Base (K-9), South Korea, 5 December 1950 – 30 January 1951
 Deployed to Itazuke Air Base, Japan, 31 January–20 June 1951
 Deployed to Misawa Air Base, Japan, 13–16 October 1952
 Deployed to Chitose Air Base, Japan, 17 October 1952 – c. 13 February 1953
 Deployed to RAF Sturgate, England, 7 May–17 August 1955
 Deployed to Kadena Air Base, Okinawa, 6 September–18 December 1958
 Cannon Air Force Base, New Mexico, 18 February 1959 – 30 September 2007
 Deployed to Incirlik Air Base, Turkey, 18 October 1959 – 22 February 1960
 Deployed to Clark Air Base, Philippines, 13 February–c. 7 March 1961
 Deployed to England Air Force Base, Louisiana, 29 March–5 May 1961
 Deployed to Incirlik Air Base, Turkey, 5 February–15 June 1962
 Deployed to MacDill Air Force Base, Florida, 21 October–1 December 1962
 Deployed to Da Nang Air Base, South Vietnam, 16 Mar-6 May 1964 (B Flight)
 Deployed to Clark Air Base, Philippines, 8 Aug-25 Nov 1964 (further deployed to Bien Hoa Air Base, South Vietnam, after 15 August 1964)
 Deployed to Holloman Air Force Base, New Mexico, 13 April–12 May 1966
 Cannon AFB, New Mexico, 1 October 2007 – 21 December 2007
 Cannon AFB, New Mexico, 7 April 2011 – c. 9 December 2014

Aircraft

 Trained with B-18 Bolos and A-18 Shrikes, 1940–1941
 A-24 Banshee, 1941–1942
 A-20 Havoc, 1941, 1942–1943
 A-36 Apache, 1943–1944
 P-40 Warhawk, 1944
 P-47 Thunderbolt, 1944–1945; 1946–1947
 P-51 Mustang, 1947–1948

 F-82 Twin Mustang, 1948–1950
 F-84 Thunderjet, 1950–1951, 1951–1957
 F-101 Voodoo, 1957–1958, 1958
 F-100 Super Sabre, 1959–1969
 F-111D Aardvark, 1969–1970, 1970–1971, 1971–1998
 F-16 Falcon, 1996–2007
 MC-130J Commando II, 2011 – present

References

Notes

Bibliography

 
 
 
 
 
 

Military units and formations in New Mexico
Special operations squadrons of the United States Air Force